The 2014 Boels Ladies Tour also known as the 2014 Holland Ladies Tour is the 17th edition of the Holland Ladies Tour, a women's cycle stage race in the Netherlands. The tour is part of the 2014 women's road cycling calendar and will be held from 2 September to 7 September. The tour has an UCI rating of 2.1.

Ellen van Dijk won the tour in 2013 and will defend her title.

Teams
20 teams of maximal 6 riders take part.
UCI teams

Alé–Cipollini
Hitec Products UCK
Astana BePink
Lotto–Belisol Ladies
Bigla Cycling Team
TIBCO–To The Top

Other teams

RC Jan van Arckel
De Jonge Renner
MIX Futurumshop Zannata-NWVG
Restore Cycling

National teams

Italy
United States
Belgium

Stages

Stage 1 (ITT)
2 September – Varik to Tiel, 

The course was flat but there was head wind during the race.

World Time Trial Champion Ellen van Dijk won the time trial 12 seconds ahead of Lisa Brennauer and 24 seconds ahead of Trixi Worrack (both ). Van Dijk said after the race that the time trial was very hard and she started a bit too fast. Furthermore, she said that she was very happy with the victory. She invested a lot of time in the time trial the last period and was pleased that after several second places in time trials this year she now took home the victory.

Stage 1 result & General classification

Stage 2
3 September – Tiel to Tiel, 
 before the finish the last two leaders Willeke Knol en Carmen Small were pulled back by the bunch. The race ended in a bunch sprint won by Lisa Brennauer ahead of Jolien D'Hoore (Lotto–Belisol Ladies) and Marianne Vos. Ellen van Dijk kept her lead in the general classification. But with Brennauer taking 10 bonification seconds at the finish line, she is now less than a second in second place behind Van Dijk in the classification.

Stage 3
4 September – Heeze to Leende,

Stage 4
5 September – Gennep to Gennep,

Stage 5
6 September – Wijchen to Wijchen,

Stage 6
7 September – Bunde to Berg en Terblijt,

Classification leadership

See also

 2014 in women's road cycling

References

External links

 

Boels Rental Ladies Tour
Boels Rental Ladies Tour
Holland Ladies Tour
Cycling in Gelderland
Cycling in Gennep
Cycling in Heeze-Leende
Cycling in Meerssen
Cycling in Tiel
Cycling in Valkenburg aan de Geul
Cycling in West Betuwe
Sport in Wijchen